Yazıbaşı may refer to:

 Yazıbaşı, Adıyaman
 Yazıbaşı, Çaycuma
 Yazıbaşı, Demirözü
 Yazıbaşı, Karaisalı
 Yazıbaşı, Kovancılar